The Third Cabinet of Lars Løkke Rasmussen (colloquially, VLAK-regeringen or trekløverregeringen) took office on 28 November 2016, and succeeded the Second Cabinet of Lars Løkke Rasmussen. It was a minority coalition government consisting of Venstre, the Liberal Alliance, and the Conservative People's Party. It relied on parliamentary support from the Danish People's Party. Following the 2019 state election, Rasmussen tabled his resignation and the government continued as a caretaker government until 27 June when the Frederiksen Cabinet was appointed.

List of ministers

References

Rasmussen, Lars Lokke 3
2016 establishments in Denmark
Cabinets established in 2016